Pocantico Hills is a hamlet in the Westchester County town of Mount Pleasant, New York, United States.

The Rockefeller family estate, anchored by Kykuit, the family seat built by John D. Rockefeller Sr., is located in Pocantico Hills, as is the adjacent Rockefeller State Park Preserve.

History
The area was originally settled by Native Americans of the Wecquaesgeek tribes; "Pocantico" means "stream between two hills", a reference to the meandering Pocantico River. The hamlet was once a part of Philipsburg Manor.

The area was once called Beeckmantown, after the family of Stephen D. Beeckman, who had lived in a residence on the highest ground of the area, just west of the "Irving Institute".

John D. Rockefeller began buying land in Pocantico Hills in 1893.

In 1880, The "Old Put" Railroad ran from New York to Brewster. The section between East View and Pocantico Hills, travelled over an 80-foot-high trestle over a marsh-filled valley. Because of the dangers of crossing the bridge, which often required that trains slow down to a crawl, the line was rerouted west around that valley in 1881. The bridge was torn down in 1883, and the valley became the Tarrytown Reservoir. The railroad ran through the Rockefeller property. In 1928, John D. Rockefeller Jr. negotiated with New York Central Railroad to relocate the line to along the Saw Mill River, costing $200,000, which Rockefeller Jr. paid.

When the De La Salle Brothers' property in Amawalk was condemned to make way for the New Croton Reservoir, they relocated their novitiate to Pocantico. Around 1929, the Rockefeller family purchased the property.

The Stone Barns agricultural center in Pocantico Hills was established in 2003 to demonstrate multi-cultural, self-sustaining farming techniques; it is host to the Blue Hill restaurant, a high-end eatery which features foodstuffs grown (or raised) on the Stone Barns property.

Education
The hamlet is a part of the Pocantico Hills Central School District, and the Pocantico Hills School, a K-8 school, has a diverse district that lays across town and village borders, including areas of Sleepy Hollow, Pleasantville, Briarcliff Manor, and Elmsford, New York. On graduating from Pocantico Hills School, as there is no high school for the district students to attend, they are afforded the choice of attending Sleepy Hollow, Briarcliff, or Pleasantville High School.

Churches
The Roman Catholic Parish of the Magdalene began in 1893 as a mission Church of St. Teresa of Avila parish in North Tarrytown to serve about forty families in Pocantico Hills and Eastview. The Church was dedicated in September 1895. A significant benefactor of the parish was grocery store magnate James Butler of Eastview.

The Union Church of Pocantico Hills was built by the Rockefeller family in 1921. It features stained glass windows by Henri Matisse and Marc Chagall. The Matisse window was his final piece prior to his death in 1954 and was commissioned by Nelson A. Rockefeller in memory of his mother, Abby Aldrich Rockefeller, one of the founders of the Museum of Modern Art.

Government 

The hamlet lies within, and is governed by the Town of Mount Pleasant, New York.

Emergency services stem from a variety of sources, with policing services provided by the Town of Mount Pleasant Police Department, fire protection services provided from the all-volunteer Pocantico Hills Fire Department, and emergency medical services from a combination of the Sleepy Hollow Volunteer Ambulance Corps (SHVAC), Pleasantville Volunteer Ambulance Corps (PVAC), and Westchester EMS.

The fire department has a tanker truck which often responds mutual-aid to neighboring fire districts when called upon, having assisted at fire related incidents in the Villages of Pleasantville, Briarcliff Manor, Croton-on-Hudson, Ossining, Sleepy Hollow, Tarrytown, Irvington, and Elmsford, as well as the hamlets Archville, Hawthorne, Thornwood, and Valhalla.

The first volunteer fire department, Liberty Hook and Ladder Company, was organized in 1904.

Notable people
 Marianne Hagan (b. 1968), actress and writer, was raised in Pocantico Hills.
 David Rockefeller (1915–2017), philanthropist and head of Chase Manhattan, died in Pocantico Hills on March 20, 2017.

References

External links
 
 "Life at Pocantico Then and Now" -interview with David Rockefeller

 
Hamlets in New York (state)
Hamlets in Westchester County, New York